This is a list of programs broadcast on TVA. TVA is a French language television network in Canada, which broadcasts over the air in Quebec and is available in the rest of Canada on cable.

A

B
Le Banquier
Les Brillant
Bugs Bunny et ses amis

C
Caméra Café
Canadian Football League
Chambres en ville
Chanteurs masqués
La classe de 5e
Le cœur a ses raisons
Cornemuse

D
Dieu merci!
Double Défi
Dr House

E
L'École des fans
Esprits criminels
L'Été indien / talk show
L'expérience Messmer / variety show

F
Fais-moi un dessin
Les Feux de L'amour
Fort Boyard
Fortier

G
Le Grand Blond avec un show sournois
Grendizer

H
Les héros

J
JE
Jeopardy!
Juste pour rire

K
km/h

L
Lance et compte
La liste noire: Rédemption
Lol:-)

M
Maman Dion
Monk

O
Occupation Double

P
Patof
Les Pierrafeu
Piment Fort
Le Poing J
La Poule aux œufs d'or

Q
Quoi de neuf, Bugs?

R
Le Recrue

S
Sailor Moon
La série Montréal-Québec
Shopping TVA
Les Sœurs Elliot
Star Académie

T
Taxi 0-22
Teletubbies
Top Modèles
TVA Nouvelles

U
Ultimatum

V
Vertige
La Voix

Y
Yamaska

References

External links
TVA Télévision Programming through the years - Canadian Communications Foundation

TVA